Jerry Taylor (born 1962) is an American environmental activist and policy analyst.

Jerry or Gerry Taylor may also refer to:

 Jerry Taylor (politician) (1937–2016), American politician and businessman
 Gerry Taylor (born 1947), footballer
 Jerry Taylor (publisher), aka Gerald L. Taylor, publisher of National Lampoon magazine
 Gerry Taylor (golfer), Australian professional golfer

See also
Jermaine Taylor (disambiguation)
Gerald Taylor (disambiguation)
Jeremy Taylor (disambiguation)